Joannes (or Ioannes) Florentius a Kempis (Brussels, baptised on 1 August 1635 – after 1711) was a Flemish Baroque composer and organist.

Biography
Joannes Florentius was born in Brussels as the fifth son of Nicolaes a Kempis, an organist and composer. He likely studied music with his father, Joannes Florentius was also a composer and an organist. Between 1670 and 1672, he succeeded to his father's position as an organist at the St. Michael and Gudula Cathedral in Brussels. Before that, he held a similar position at the Church of Our Blessed Lady of the Sablon in Brussels.

Works
His collection of Cantiones Natalitiae for five voices was published in 1657 at the Phalesius press in Antwerp. Similar volumes of Christmas carols composed by a single composer were published by the same press.  The authors included composers Petrus Hurtado, Guillielmus Borremans, Gaspar de Verlit, Joannes vander Wielen and Franciscus Loots. Furthermore, a Kempis published a mass, a sequence Victimae paschalis and twelve sonatas for violin, viola da gamba and double bass. A polychoral Canticle of Zachary has been ascribed to Guillelmus (Guillaume) a Kempis.

Sources

1635 births
18th-century deaths
Flemish Baroque composers
17th-century classical composers
Male classical composers
Male organists
Flemish organists
1600s births
1676 deaths
18th-century classical composers
18th-century male musicians
17th-century male musicians